Young Prayer is the second solo album by American experimental pop musician Panda Bear, released on September 28, 2004. It follows his debut solo album Panda Bear (1999). It is his first since co-founding Animal Collective.

Background
None of the songs on the album have a title because Lennox wanted the album to be "one nugget of sound. I put the track markers in there just to separate the sections."
The songs were all written around the time of the death of Lennox' father. About this fact, Lennox said: 

In another Interview, Lennox got into detail about this: 

The whole album was written in a very quick process and recorded with Animal Collective member Deakin in "two or three days or something." According to the artist, it "is very classically influenced. All the weird baroque flourishes and stuff in terms of the way I’m singing. And that was definitely intentional, I set out to do something that sounded like that." The album was produced and mixed entirely without Lennox by Rusty Santos and the rest of Animal Collective. Though it was changed quite a bit during the post-production, Lennox was "very happy with the way it sounded" when he received the result.

The album art was produced by Abby Portner, the sister of fellow Animal Collective member Dave Portner aka Avey Tare.

Reception

The album was a critical success, even being labeled "Best New Music" by Pitchfork.

Track listing

References

2004 albums
Panda Bear (musician) albums